Ward Swift Just (September 5, 1935 – December 19, 2019) was an American writer.  He was a war correspondent and the author of 19 novels and numerous short stories.

Biography

Just was born in Michigan City, Indiana, attended Lake Forest Academy, and subsequently graduated from the Kingswood School (today Cranbrook Kingswood School) in 1953. He briefly attended Trinity College in Hartford, Connecticut.  He started his career as a print journalist for the Waukegan (Illinois) News-Sun. He married three times and had three children.

Just died of complications from Lewy body dementia in Plymouth, Massachusetts on December 19, 2019. He was 84 years old.

War correspondent
Just covered the war in Cyprus (1957) and the conflict in the Dominican Republic for Newsweek. Then Benjamin Bradlee hired Just at The Washington Post as a war correspondent for the Vietnam war. He published close to 400 articles, many appearing on the front page.

He met journalist Frances Fitzgerald at a party soon after her arrival in Saigon in early 1966 and began a relationship with her that continued until she left South Vietnam in November 1966.

He was wounded on 8 June 1966 covering Operation Hawthorne, but returned to Saigon for a second tour after recovering in Washington, D.C. Leaving Saigon in May 1967, he wrote "To What End: Report from Vietnam," credited as being an important element in helping the nation understand the futility of that war. He went on to cover the presidential campaigns of both Eugene McCarthy and Richard Nixon for the Post in 1968 and was then asked to join its editorial board.

Fiction writing

Just's influences included Henry James and Ernest Hemingway.  His novel An Unfinished Season was a finalist for the Pulitzer Prize for Fiction in 2005. His novel Echo House was a finalist for the National Book Award in 1997.  He was twice a finalist for the O. Henry Award, in 1985 for his short story About Boston, and again in 1986 for his short story The Costa Brava, 1959.  
He was Spring 1999 Rome Prize fellow.

His fiction is often concerned with the influence of national politics on Americans' personal lives.  Much of it is set in Washington D.C. and foreign countries.  Another common theme is the alienation felt by Midwesterners in the East.

According to Washington Post book critic Jonathan Yardley, Just's finest novels are A Family Trust, An Unfinished Season, Exiles in the Garden, and American Romantic. He also lists Just's short story collection, The Congressman Who Loved Flaubert, as one of his favorite books. Yardley recently wrote that "American Romantic may well be the best of them all."

In a column at Literary Hub in 2018, Susan Zakin wrote that "Ward Just is not merely America’s best political novelist. He is America’s greatest living novelist. To our discredit, he’s also America’s Greatest Unknown Novelist."

In May 2013, The American Academy of Arts and Letters at its annual induction and award ceremony inducted Ward Just as a new member of the Academy and honored his lifetime achievement in the field of Literature, along with an exhibition of his manuscripts.

Works

Novels
A Soldier of the Revolution (1970)
Stringer (1974)
Nicholson at Large (1975)
A Family Trust (1978)
In the City of Fear (1982)
The American Blues (1984)
The American Ambassador (1987)
Jack Gance (1989)
The Translator (1991)
Ambition & Love (1994)
Echo House (1997)
A Dangerous Friend (1999)
The Weather in Berlin (2002)
An Unfinished Season (2004)
Forgetfulness (2006)
Exiles In The Garden (2009)
Rodin's Debutante (2011)
American Romantic (2014)
The Eastern Shore (2016)

Story collections
The Congressman Who Loved Flaubert (1973)
Honor, Power, Riches, Fame, and the Love of Women (1979)
Twenty-one: Selected Stories (1990)
 Lowell Limpett and Two Stories (2001)

Nonfiction
To What End (1968)
Military Men (1970)

Plays
Lowell Limpett (2001)

Anthologized in
Reporting Vietnam: American Journalism 1959–1969 (Part One) (1998)

References

External links

Houghton Mifflin author page for Ward Just
Perseus Books Group author page for Ward Just
Ward Just resources on the Web
Ward Just's Washington by Michael Nelson, published in The Virginia Quarterly Review
Brief biography with links to book excerpts from the PBS series Reporting America At War produced by Insignia Films and WETA
Interview, online at CBC Words at Large (audio)
Ward Just Papers in Cranbrook Archives, Bloomfield Hills, Michigan

1935 births
2019 deaths
American male journalists
20th-century American novelists
American short story writers
Lake Forest Academy alumni
Cranbrook Educational Community alumni
Newsweek people
People from Michigan City, Indiana
People from Waukegan, Illinois
The Washington Post people
Novelists from Illinois
Novelists from Indiana
James Fenimore Cooper Prize winners
21st-century American novelists
American male novelists
American male short story writers
21st-century American non-fiction writers
20th-century American male writers
21st-century American male writers
Deaths from dementia in Massachusetts
Deaths from Lewy body dementia
Members of the American Academy of Arts and Letters